Double or nothing (UK often double or quits) is a gamble to decide whether a loss or debt should be doubled. The result of a "double or nothing" bet is either the subject doubled to twice the amount as the original or the doubling of a debt. It can be seen as a gentleman's agreement which grants losers of an initial bet a chance to win their money back, with minimal risk to the winner. In the event the second bet or game is rendered incomplete, the original bet cannot be enforced until the completion of said second bet. This rule is non-negotiable.

Example 
 Person A wins an initial $5 bet against Person B.
 Before the initial bet is repaid, Person A and Person B agree to a second bet, also in the amount of $10 because the bet was doubled or "Double or Nothing". 
 If person A wins bet 2, they are owed $10 total from Person B. $5 from the first bet + $5 from the second = $10 total.
 If person B wins bet 2,  person B no longer owes any money to person A. If person B lost they would owe double but since they won, they owe nothing. The original bet is null.

Poker 
In poker, a double or nothing tournament is a sit'n'go tournament where half of the surviving players get double the buy-in and the eliminated half does not receive any prizes. Double or nothing tournaments are mostly played by ten players (five players win) or six players (three-win), although multi-table versions, such as for 20 players, exist. The rake in these tournaments is usually smaller than in standard sit'n'go tournaments. Some poker rooms also offer triple or nothing tournaments, where one-third of the playing field gets paid.

Wagers 
In wagers, the same rules/applications usually apply.

Blackjack 
Not to be confused with "doubling down" in blackjack.

See also 
 Martingale (betting system)

References 

Gambling terminology
Poker gameplay and terminology